The 1959 Tour de Romandie was the 13th edition of the Tour de Romandie cycle race and was held from 7 May to 10 May 1959. The race started and finished in Fribourg. The race was won by Kurt Gimmi.

General classification

References

1959
Tour de Romandie